The Basith are Hindu caste found in Jammu and Kashmir. According to the 2001 Census of India, the caste has 18,866 members. They are also known as Vashist Rajput from 1953 as being a controversial caste most members of the community are having scheduled caste certificates but all the members don't have scheduled caste certificate as they still lie in general category in some records and most prominent members of this caste claim forgery with their caste records and support their claim by the constitution of India if most of them are basith in revenue records and getting benefits of all kinds then why some of them are not getting those benefits. Moreover, some members of the community are of the opinion who has changed their revenue record to vashist rajput as the change in caste can only be done by honorable president of India, but in this case no such order by the president has been passed so most of the times they claim their fundamental rights to be infringed.

History

According to tradition, the Vashist Rajput immigrated from Chamba in Himachal Pradesh in the nineteenth century to Poonch. The  Vashist Rajput speak Pahari and their customs are similar to neighboring communities, such as the Domaal. They are a Hindu community in a predominantly Muslim region. They were traditionally cultivators.
The Vashist Rajput maintain distance from neighboring Muslim communities with strict restrictions on eating together.

Culture 
The basith population is small and has no political representation. Many are farmers and the majority are poor. They worship Ganga, the Gita, and Gow Mata . Sub-castes of basiths includes Telchubs, Chasyals, Charnals, Sukhwals, Singhals, Sanwals and Malhotra.

The basith are endogamous and practice clan exogamy. Their clans are called zaats and include the Chatriyal, Chimal, Raine, Sangwal; Kangwal; Bangwal; Chasyal; Salotre, each of which have their own origin legend. A number of zaats then form a gotra. For example, the Chatriyal belong to the Changin gotra, the Charnals have Bharadwaj gotra and the Chimal belong to the Pardwari gotra. Like many North Indian Hindus, the basith community have an informal caste council called a biradari panchayat. Each of their settlements have this informal body, headed by a chaudhary. The panchayat deals with all intra-community disputes, as well as those who breach community norms. Marriages with other communities also takes place excommunicated. The basith are Hindu of the Satnami sect. They worship the Hindi pantheon as well as their clan gods and goddesses, called kul-devitas.

References

Caste